Himantarium is a genus of centipedes in the family Himantariidae. Centipedes in this genus range from 10 cm to 20 cm in length, have from 87 to 179 pairs of legs, and are found in the Mediterranean region.

Species
Himantarium gabrielis  (Linnaeus, 1767) 
Himantarium mediterraneum  (Meinert, 1870)

References

 Minelli A., Bonato L. (2006) "European geophilomorph centipedes (Chilopoda: Geophilomorpha): a complete synonymical list with taxonomic and nomenclatural notes"

Centipede genera
Geophilomorpha